Lancaster Municipal Airport  is a city owned public use airport located four nautical miles (5 mi, 7 km) south of the central business district of Lancaster, a city in Grant County, Wisconsin, United States. 
It is included in the Federal Aviation Administration (FAA) National Plan of Integrated Airport Systems for 2021–2025, in which it is categorized as a basic general aviation facility.

Facilities and aircraft 
Lancaster Municipal Airport covers an area of 27 acres (11 ha) at an elevation of 1,008 feet (307 m) above mean sea level. It has one runway designated 18/36 with an asphalt surface measuring 3,300 by 60 feet (1,006 x 18 m).

For the 12-month period ending April 22, 2021, the airport had 8,400 general aviation aircraft operations, an average of 23 per day. In January 2023, there were 9 aircraft based at this airport: 7 single-engine, 1 helicopter and 1 glider.

See also
 List of airports in Wisconsin

References

External links 
  at Wisconsin DOT Airport Directory

Airports in Wisconsin
Buildings and structures in Grant County, Wisconsin